Seres are the people of Serica, one of the easternmost countries of Asia known to the ancient Greeks and Romans.

Seres may also refer to:

People

Brands and enterprises

See also 
 Celes (disambiguation)
 Ceres (disambiguation)
 Seles (disambiguation)
 Serres (disambiguation)